Hotzaah (Hebrew: הוצאה), more specifically hotzaah mereshut lereshut or transferring between domains, is one of the activities prohibited on Shabbat in Judaism.

Biblical sources
While there is no explicit prohibition in the written Torah for carrying objects between domains on the Sabbath, according to traditional Jewish commentators, this category of melakha (work) is mentioned in :
"Let no man go out from his place on the seventh day"
According to the Talmud, the manna could not be collected on Sabbath because it could not be carried into the Israelites' homes.

Another rabbinically quoted verse is :
Moses commanded, and a message was propagated in the camp saying, Let no man or woman do any more work for the holy donation, and the people ceased to bring.
The Talmud understands the latter verse to refer to the people ceasing to carry their donations from their personal domains to the sanctuary, on Shabbat.

The book of Jeremiah is more explicit:
Thus says the LORD: Take heed for the sake of your souls, and carry no burden on the Sabbath day, nor bring it in by the gates of Jerusalem; nor carry forth a burden out of your houses on the Sabbath day, nor do any work; but rather make holy the Sabbath day - as I commanded your fathers, but they listened not, nor inclined their ear, but made their neck stiff, that they might not hear, nor receive instruction. And it shall be if you listen to Me, says the LORD, not to bring any burden into the gates of this city on the Sabbath day, and to make holy the Sabbath day not to perform any labor on it. Then shall there enter into the gates of this city kings and princes sitting on David's throne, riding in chariots and with horses, they and their princes the men of Judah and the inhabitants of Jerusalem, and this city shall be inhabited forever.

The latter quote specifies two types of carrying which are forbidden - carrying into the gates of Jerusalem, or out of an individual's house.

The book of Nehemiah contains a similar description:
In those days I saw in Judah some treading winepresses on the sabbath, and bringing in heaps of corn, and lading donkeys with it; as also wine, grapes, and figs, and all manner of burdens, which they brought into Jerusalem on the sabbath day. ... Then I contended with the nobles of Judah, and said to them: "What evil thing is this that you do, and profane the sabbath day?" ... And when the gates of Jerusalem began to be dark before the sabbath, I commanded that the doors should be shut, and commanded that they should not be opened until after the sabbath; and some of my servants set I over the gates, that there should no burden be brought in on the sabbath day.

Domains
According to halacha, all areas are divided into four categories:
 A private domain (Reshut HaYachid)
 A public domain, or thoroughfare (Reshut HaRabbim)
 An open area (Karmelit)
 An exempt area (Makom Petur)

The open area is defined as not bounded by walls or fences, and which also is not traversed by large numbers of people. By the Torah, the open area is considered an exempt area; however rabbinic enactments treat it more strictly.

Two activities are biblically forbidden:
 Transferring an object from a private domain to a public thoroughfare, or vice versa.
 Transferring an object a distance of 4 cubits in a public thoroughfare.
In addition, three activities are rabbinically forbidden:
 Transferring an object from a private domain to an open area, or vice versa.
 Transferring an object a distance of 4 cubits in an open area.
 Transferring an object between two different private domains.

The following activities are permitted:
 Transferring an object within a single private domain.
 Transferring an object between an exempt area and any other domains. However, it is sometimes forbidden to use an exempt area as a "stopover" when the intent is to transfer between two other domains.
 Transferring an object across multiple open areas, as long as the total distance carried is less than 4 cubits.

Methods of transfer
This has the following implications:
 If a person picks up an object and begins walking, the Torah law has not been violated until he stops walking (stopping while holding an object is considered tantamount to depositing the object). Even a brief pause to rest is considered a hanacha which causes Torah law to be violated.
 If a person did not pick up an object at all, but rather the object was deposited in his hands by another person while he was walking, he does not violate Torah law even after stopping, as he never performed .
 If two people carried an object together (such as two people lifting opposite ends of a box), neither one has violated Torah law. However, this is rabbinically forbidden.
 If a person picked up an object in a private domain, exited to a public domain, continued walking to another private domain, and deposited the object there - he has not violated Torah law. This is because he never picked up or deposited the object in the public domain, so there was no forbidden transfer between public and private domains. Of course, if at any point while walking in the public domain he stopped momentarily, that would cause Torah law to be violated. In any case, transfer between two different private domains violates rabbinic law.

If a person, while walking, lets the object he is holding approach within three handbreadths of the ground, it is considered as if the object has been placed on the ground. This can generate additional violations of Torah law.

Throwing an object from one domain to another has the same rules as carrying the object between those domains.

See also
Activities prohibited on Shabbat
Eruv
Shabbat (Talmud)

References

Laws of Shabbat
Negative Mitzvoth